The Gibraltar national football team is the representative association football team of Gibraltar, a British Overseas Territory located at the southern tip of the Iberian Peninsula. Its governing body is the Gibraltar Football Association (GFA) and it competes as a member of the Union of European Football Associations (UEFA). Organised football has been played in Gibraltar since the 19th century. The GFA first applied for UEFA membership in 1997 which was rejected, as UEFA would only allow membership for applicants recognised as sovereign states by the United Nations. They were unsuccessful in their second application in 2007 when only three of UEFA's 52 associations voted in their favour. In October 2012, they reapplied for membership which was granted in March 2013. Before 2018 the team's home ground, Victoria Stadium, did not meet UEFA's standards for competitive internationals, although it could be used for international friendlies. Gibraltar's first full international was played at the Estádio Algarve, located between Faro and Loulé, Portugal, which Gibraltar used as their home stadium for competitive matches between 2014 and 2018.

Gibraltar's first announced matches were two friendlies scheduled for 5 March and 26 May 2014 as a home-and-away series against Estonia. They subsequently scheduled a match against Slovakia for 19 November 2013 which became Gibraltar's official debut, the match ended 0–0. In 2014 Gibraltar entered its first major international competition: the qualifying rounds for UEFA Euro 2016, they lost all ten matches, scoring 2 goals and conceding 56, therefore failing to qualify for the main tournament. On 13 May 2016, Gibraltar was accepted as a member of the International Federation of Association Football (FIFA) after its original application in 2014 was denied; as a result Gibraltar was allowed to participate in the qualification process for the 2018 FIFA World Cup.

The team recorded its first victory in June 2014, 1–0 against Malta in a friendly match. Their largest victory is 2–0 against Liechtenstein. Their worst loss is a 9–0 against Belgium in a FIFA World Cup qualifier on 31 August 2017. As of the match played on 19 November 2022, Gibraltar's overall record is 74 fixtures played, winning 8, drawing 9 and losing the remaining 57.

International matches
These are the official results of the Gibraltar national football team since being accepted into UEFA in 2013. Matches played before obtaining UEFA membership are unofficial matches and are not included. Gibraltar's score is shown first in each case. The colours listed below are also used to signify results combined with the scoreline.

Head to head records

See also
 Gibraltar national football team results (unofficial matches)
 Gibraltar national football team records and statistics

Notes

References
Statistics
 
 

Specific

Results